Ola is an unincorporated community in Henry County, Georgia, United States. Ola residents use a McDonough mailing address.

History
The community was named after Ola Patten, the daughter of an early settler.

Geography
Ola is located at  (33.43527, -84.04156).

Major highways
 Georgia State Route 81

Demographics
Most of Ola is within the postal limits of McDonough, Georgia and as such, most residents list McDonough as their city.  However, some of the areas of Ola are in Henry County though they have a Jackson, Georgia (Butts County) mailing address.

Schools
Mainstay Academy (Special Education school)
New Hope Elementary School
Ola Elementary School
Ola Middle School
Ola High School
Rock Springs Elementary School
Sharon Christian Academy

References

Unincorporated communities in Henry County, Georgia
Unincorporated communities in Georgia (U.S. state)